"Sock It 2 Me" is a song recorded by American rapper Missy "Misdemeanor" Elliott featuring American rapper Da Brat. It was written by Shawntae Harris, William Hart, Thom Bell  and producer Timothy "Timbaland" Mosley for her debut album Supa Dupa Fly (1997) and released as the album's second single in a slightly re-recorded form. The song is based on a sample from the 1968 single "Ready or Not Here I Come (Can't Hide from Love)" by the Delfonics.

The track peaked at number 12 on the U.S. Billboard Hot 100, and reached the top ten on the Hot R&B/Hip-Hop Singles & Tracks, the Rhythmic Top 40, and on the Hot Dance Music/Maxi-Singles Sales charts.

Music video
Directed by Hype Williams, the music video takes place on a remote planet where robot monsters are chasing Missy Elliott & Lil' Kim, who are wearing red and white space suits. Towards the end of the video, Da Brat rescues the pair, before rapping her verse in a black and yellow space suit. One notable moment in the video is when Elliott and other dancers perform Michael Jackson's "Smooth Criminal" dance aboard a space ship.

Formats and track listings
These are the formats and track listings of major single-releases of "Sock It 2 Me."

US 12" single 
Side A
"Sock It 2 Me" (Radio Version) (featuring Da Brat)
"Sock It 2 Me" (LP Version - Dirty) (featuring Da Brat)
Side B
"Pass Da Blunt" (LP Version - Dirty) (featuring Timbaland)
"Sock It 2 Me" (Instrumental)
"Sock It 2 Me" (A cappella) (featuring Da Brat)

International 12" single 
Side A
"Sock It 2 Me" (LP Version) (featuring Da Brat) - 4:22
"Sock It 2 Me" (Radio Version) (featuring Da Brat) - 4:21
"Sock It 2 Me" (Instrumental) - 4:46
"Sock It 2 Me" (A cappella) (featuring Da Brat) - 4:33
Side B
"The Rain (Supa Dupa Fly)" (LP Version Dirty) - 4:11
"The Rain (Supa Dupa Fly)" (Instrumental) - 4:10
"The Rain (Supa Dupa Fly)" (Acapella) - 4:10
"Release The Tension" - 4:11

12" single 
Side A
"Sock It 2 Me" (Radio Version) (featuring Da Brat) - 4:21
"Sock It 2 Me" (Instrumental) - 4:46
Side B
"Sock It 2 Me" (Acapella) (featuring Da Brat) - 4:33
"Release the Tension" - 4:11

German CD Maxi-single 
"Sock It 2 Me" (Radio Version) (featuring Da Brat) - 4:21
"Sock It 2 Me" (Instrumental) - 4:46
"Sock It 2 Me" (A cappella) (featuring Da Brat) - 4:33
"Release The Tension" - 4:11

Charts and certifications

Weekly charts

Year-end charts

Certifications

|}

References

Notes

ASCAP Ace database entry for "Sock It 2 Me"

External links
 Missy-Elliott.com — official site

1997 singles
Missy Elliott songs
Music videos directed by Hype Williams
Song recordings produced by Timbaland
Songs written by Missy Elliott
Songs written by Timbaland
Songs written by Da Brat
1997 songs
Songs written by Thom Bell
Elektra Records singles